Cheer Athletics is one of the largest All-Star cheerleading programs in the United States, with thousands of athletes competing on 80+ teams from Plano, Texas (near Dallas), Austin, Texas, Frisco, Texas, Charlotte, North Carolina, Columbus, Ohio, Pittsburgh, Pennsylvania, Denver, Colorado, St. Louis, Missouri, Rochester, New York, Dallas, Texas, Omaha, Nebraska and Pensacola, Florida.  Cheer Athletics have won 24 World Championships at The Cheerleading Worlds sponsored by the USASF.

In 2007, CA's owner/coaches were ranked #1 in the country by American Cheerleader Magazine's list of the 25 Most Influential People in All-Star Cheerleading.  Cheer Athletics teams have consistently outpaced other cheer programs with more than 70 National Titles from the National Cheerleaders Association (NCA) and earned 53 medals from the USASF Worlds.

History 
Source:

1994-1995

Cheer Athletics began in May 1994 when co-founders Jody Melton and Angela Rogers began their first practice with 2 athletes at a local park in Plano, TX.

1995-1996

The 1995-96 season brought many new challenges. Cheer Athletics had more than tripled in size since nationals, with 3 main teams: Panthers, Tigers, Jags. CA now had a total of 58 athletes and was tasting its first success at local and regional competitions.

1996-1997

The gym had now grown to have 5 teams: Cats, Jags, Tigers, Panthers, and Wildcats. Cheer Athletics debuted at the 1997 NCA All-Star Nationals.

1997-1998

Cheer Athletics had become the largest program in the country with 8 teams: Cats, Jags, Tigers, Sabres, Cougars, Panthers, Wildcats, and Cheetahs. By the spring of 1998, Cheer Athletics moved into its own practice facility; a former baseball training center just down the street from NCA's main offices.

1998-1999

As Cheer Athletics expanded, there were now 13 teams in the CA Family: KittyKats, Cats, Jags, Bengals, Bobcats, Tigers, Thundercats, Sabres, Bearcats, Panthers, Pumas, Wildcats, and Cheetahs. Interested in this up-and-coming program, the New York Times Production Company sent a film crew to feature two Cheer Athletics teams in a documentary, "On the Inside: Cheerleading" which aired the Discovery Channel.

1999-2000 

Through continued hard work by athletes and coaches, Cheer Athletics had claimed over 30 team titles by the conclusion of the 1999-2000 season.

2000-2001

The 2000-2001 season brought their team national championship total to 53.

2001-2002

During the 2001/2002 season, the gym won more national titles than any other program has ever won in a single year, bringing home a staggering 33 team national championship titles during this single season, bringing their overall total to 86.

2002-2003

An amazing season with 30 national championship titles brought the overall title count to 116.

2003-2004

Cheer Athletics was invited to compete in the first annual USASF World Championships. Supercats won the first-ever World Championship in the Senior All Girl division.

2013

Cheer Athletics Austin was opened.

2014

New locations in Frisco, TX & Charlotte, NC were opened.

2016

A new location in Columbus, Ohio was opened.

2018

A new location in Pittsburgh, PA was opened.

2020

New locations in Dallas, TX; Denver, CO; and St. Louis, MO were opened.

2021

New locations in Omaha, NE; Pensacola, FL; and Rochester, NY are opened.

2023

First international location in Telford, UK opened .

Teams: 22-23 Season 
Currently: 149 teams, ranging in age from 2 to adult.

This does not include all of the teams of location in Omaha, NE as they have yet to be officially published for 22-23 Season (as of 11/29/2022).

Awards and Accomplishments

NCA Nationals Results 

Source:

Cheerleading Worlds Results 

Source:

Cheerleading Summit Results 

Source:

Controversy 
In September 2020, Jerry Harris, an American cheerleader featured on the Netflix documentary series Cheer, was arrested on suspicion of sexual misconduct and child pornography.  Cheer Athletics founder Angela Rogers is accused in a lawsuit alongside multiple other entities of tipping off Harris to an investigation by the FBI and negligence surrounding their handling of allegations of Harris' behavior that could have prevented the sexual misconduct and protected students and participants.

Cheer Athletics and Angela Rogers have come under further scrutiny following the uncovering of several public contacts made between Harris and Rogers in May 2020 after Rogers had claimed that she and Cheer Athletics had ceased involvement with Harris as of March 1, 2020.  In July 2020, Cheer Athletics posted a photo of Harris to their Instagram account celebrating six Emmy Nominations for the Cheer series. The matter is still pending in court and Rogers maintains a stance of uninvolvement.

References 

All Star Cheerleading Gyms
Performing groups established in 1994
Sports in Texas
1994 establishments in Texas